Gabriele Dambrone is a 1943 German drama film directed by Hans Steinhoff and starring Gusti Huber, Siegfried Breuer and Christl Mardayn.

It was shot at the Babelsberg Studios in Berlin. Location shooting took place in Vienna and Tyrol. It was an expensive production, with a budget of 1,627,000 Reichsmarks, but was a popular success at the box office.

Cast
 Gusti Huber as Gabi
 Siegfried Breuer as Paul Madina
 Christl Mardayn as Inge Madina
 Ewald Balser as Georg Hollberg
 Eugen Klöpfer as Gotthart
 Theodor Loos as Dr. Christopher
 Fritz Kampers as Prof. Muhry
 Annie Rosar as Frau Lauch
 Ágnes Eszterházy as Madame Yvonne
 Käthe Dobbs as Komtesse Clementine
 Maria Hofen as Walpurga
 Pepi Glöckner-Kramer as Frau Greinert
 Egon von Jordan as Stefan von Hamsa
 Alexander Trojan as Franz Lauch
 Karl Etlinger as Anton
 Georg Vogelsang as Anzelm
 Edelweiß Malchin as Mizzy
 Renate Honsig as Ludmilla Lauch
 Frieda Niederhofer as Josefa Platt
 Jenny Liese as Frl. Windweiser
 Maria von Höslin as Pia
 Lotte Martens as Olly
 Erika Helldorf as Karoline
 Friedel Hoffmann as Erna

References

Bibliography 
 Rentschler, Eric. The Ministry of Illusion: Nazi Cinema and Its Afterlife. Harvard University Press, 1996.

External links 
 

1943 films
Films of Nazi Germany
German drama films
1943 drama films
1940s German-language films
Films directed by Hans Steinhoff
German films based on plays
Terra Film films
German black-and-white films
Films shot at Babelsberg Studios
1940s German films